Joshua Smith (1732 – 20 March 1819) was an English merchant and politician.

He was born the son of John Smith, a Lambeth merchant and became a timber merchant himself. He lived at Erlestoke Park, near Devizes, Wiltshire. He became a director of the East India Company in 1771, and was Member of Parliament (MP) for Devizes from 1788 to 1818, although not an active member.

In 1766 he married Sarah, the daughter of Nathaniel Gilbert, judge and member of the legislative council of Antigua, with whom he had four daughters. Their eldest daughter Maria married in 1787 Charles Compton, 1st Marquess of Northampton.

Smith died on 20 March 1819. Subsequently, his Erlestoke seat was sold to George Watson-Taylor. Smith's library was sold at auction by Edward Jeffery on 25 May 1820 and eight following days, in 1671 lots. Two copies of the catalogue exist at Cambridge University Library, one of them annotated in a contemporary hand "offered to G. Watson Taylor Esq. MP for £2500 – sold for upwards of £4000", suggesting the library was offered to Watson Taylor too, but that he declined to acquire it.

See also
Spencer-Smith Baronets

References 

1732 births
1819 deaths
Members of the Parliament of Great Britain for English constituencies
Members of the Parliament of the United Kingdom for English constituencies
UK MPs 1801–1802
UK MPs 1802–1806
UK MPs 1806–1807
UK MPs 1807–1812
UK MPs 1812–1818
Directors of the British East India Company
British MPs 1784–1790
British MPs 1790–1796
British MPs 1796–1800